Jamides amarauge, the amarauge cerulean, is a butterfly in the family Lycaenidae. It was described by Hamilton Herbert Druce in 1891. It is found in the Australasian realm.

The larvae feed on the flowers of Pueraria lobata.

Subspecies
J. a. amarauge (New Guinea, Bougainville, Shortlands, Guadalcanal, Florida Island, Darnley Island)
J. a. amandae Rawlins, Cassidy, Müller, Schröder & Tennent, 2014 (Aru)
J. a. hepworthi Tennent, 2001 (Solomon Islands)

References

External links

Jamides
Butterflies described in 1889